Love's Masquerade is a 1922 American silent drama film directed by William P.S. Earle and starring Conway Tearle, Winifred Westover and Florence Billings.

Cast
 Conway Tearle as Russell Carrington
 Winifred Westover as Dorothy Wheeler
 Florence Billings as Rita Norwood
 Robert Ellis as Herbert Norwooood
 Danny Hayes as 'Sly Sam'
 Arthur Housman as Newspaper Reporter 
 Robert Schable as Ross Gunther

References

Bibliography
 Munden, Kenneth White. The American Film Institute Catalog of Motion Pictures Produced in the United States, Part 1. University of California Press, 1997.

External links
 

1922 films
1922 drama films
1920s English-language films
American silent feature films
Silent American drama films
American black-and-white films
Films directed by William P. S. Earle
Selznick Pictures films
1920s American films